Surinder Mehta is an Indian entrepreneur, business person and the founder of Prime Group, a technology-based conglomerate with a number of subsidiaries which include PCI Limited, Planet PCI Infotech Limited, Prime Electric Limited, Prime Power Corporation Limited and Endolite India Limited. Reported to be a self-made business person, he founded the group in 1986 with the first company, PCI Limited, and has been heading the Group since then. The Government of India awarded him the fourth highest civilian honour of the Padma Shri, in 2009, for his contributions to Indian industry.

Biography 
Mehta was born on 3 August 1956 in the Indian capital of New Delhi and did his early education at Modern School, Delhi, before graduating in Commerce with honours from the Shri Ram College of Commerce, Delhi. At the start of his career, he introduced modern technologies in power distribution sector, such as van-mounted remote fault detection system, which eliminated time-consuming manpower involvement. He is the founder of ISHWAR, a non governmental organization engaged in charitable activities and Endolite India, a chain of centres providing Prosthetic and Orthotic services.

Mehta is recipient of the honours such as PHDCCI Distinguished Entrepreneurship Award, Udyog Rattan Award, Priyadarshini Indira Gandhi Award, Rajiv Gandhi Excellence Award, Rattan Shiromani Award, and National Business Leadership Award. He received the civilian honour of the Padma Shri in 2009. He is married to Archna Mehta and the couple has a son, Rohan Mehta, and a daughter, Sneha Mehta.

See also 
 Shri Ram College of Commerce
 Modern School (New Delhi)
 List of Modern School alumni

References 

Recipients of the Padma Shri in other fields
1956 births
Businesspeople from Delhi
Modern School (New Delhi) alumni
Shri Ram College of Commerce alumni
Delhi University alumni
Indian philanthropists
Living people